The Pico River is a binational river of Patagonian Argentina and Chile. It is a tributary of the Figueroa River which it enters near El Manzanito in Chile. The river was named in honour of the engineer Octavio Pico y Burgess (1837–1892), who headed the Boundary Commission that settled the border conflict between Argentina and Chile.

See also
List of rivers of Argentina

Notes and references

 Rand McNally, The New International Atlas, 1993.

Rivers of Argentina
Rivers of Aysén Region
Rivers of Chile
Rivers of Chubut Province
International rivers of South America